Mir Qasem is a village in Balkh Province in northern Afghanistan.

See also 
Balkh Province

References

External links 
Satellite map at Maplandia.com 

Populated places in Balkh Province